Elizabeth Wanless (born November 18, 1981) is an American shot putter who competed at the 2005 World Championships without reaching the final round.

References

 Elizabeth Wanless at USA Track & Field

1981 births
Living people
American female shot putters
World Athletics Championships athletes for the United States
21st-century American women